Vasyl Vasylyovych Khimich (born 17 May 2001) is a Ukrainian-Hungarian professional footballer who plays for Kisvárda II.

Career statistics
.

References

External links
 Profile at UAF Official Site (Ukr)
 
 

2001 births
Sportspeople from Zakarpattia Oblast
Ukrainian emigrants to Hungary
Living people
Ukrainian footballers
Hungarian footballers
Association football forwards
MFA Mukachevo players
Kisvárda FC players
Nemzeti Bajnokság I players
Nemzeti Bajnokság III players